The first Turnbull ministry (Liberal–National Coalition) was the 69th ministry of the Government of Australia, led by Prime Minister Malcolm Turnbull. It succeeded the Abbott ministry after a leadership spill that took place on 14 September 2015 ended Prime Minister Tony Abbott's leadership of the Liberal Party of Australia. On 15 September, the National Party confirmed, after successful negotiations, that it would continue a coalition agreement with the Liberal Party, guaranteeing the Turnbull Government a majority in the Australian House of Representatives.

The Turnbull ministry carried over from its predecessor Abbott ministry, until Turnbull announced significant ministerial changes on 20 September 2015 which took effect the following day. On 29 December 2015, Jamie Briggs resigned from his portfolio following a complaint regarding a late night incident with a public servant; and on the same day, Mal Brough stood aside pending Australian Federal Police investigations into the James Ashby affair.

A second rearrangement was announced on 13 February 2016 following the retirements of Andrew Robb on 10 February 2016 and Warren Truss on 11 February, and the resignations from the ministry of Stuart Robert on 12 February and Mal Brough on 13 February. The second arrangement was sworn in by the Governor-General on 18 February.

First arrangement
The first arrangement of the Turnbull ministry was sworn in on 21 September 2015 and continued until 18 February 2016. Like the Abbott ministry, the Turnbull ministry contained 30 ministers, but the number of ministers in the cabinet was increased from 19 to 21, with the outer ministry being reduced from 11 to 9. There were five women in the cabinet and there was one woman in the outer ministry. There were an additional 12 assistant ministers, three of which were women.

Minor changes to the Turnbull ministry took place following the resignation of Jamie Briggs and standing down of Mal Brough on 29 December 2015 and continued until 13 February 2016 when a rearrangement took place following the retirements of Andrew Robb (on 10 February 2016) and Warren Truss (on 11 February), and the resignations of Stuart Robert (on 12 February) and Brough (on 13 February).

Cabinet

Outer Ministry

Assistant Ministers (Parliamentary Secretaries)
Assistant Ministers (other than the Assistant Treasurer) are sworn in and designated as Parliamentary Secretaries under the Ministers of State Act 1952.
However, Ministers of State who were sworn in as Parliamentary Secretaries on 21 September 2015 and 30 September 2015 are now referred to by Turnbull as Assistant Ministers to provide greater clarity.
Legislation has not been enacted to effect any change.

Second arrangement
A second rearrangement of the Turnbull ministry was announced on 13 February 2016 following the retirements of Andrew Robb on 10 February 2016 and Warren Truss on 11 February, and the resignations of Stuart Robert on 12 February and Mal Brough on 13 February. The new ministry took office on 18 February.

Following the resignation of Truss as the Nationals' leader, Barnaby Joyce became the new National Party leader with effect from 11 February, while Fiona Nash became the National's new deputy leader and the first woman to hold this position. Joyce became the new Deputy Prime Minister with effect from 18 February. The number of Nationals, as cabinet members, increased from three to four with Nash, and Darren Chester becoming cabinet members.

Nash became Minister for Rural Health, Regional Communications and Regional Development. Chester became Minister for Infrastructure and Transport. Steven Ciobo became Trade Minister and also moved into the cabinet. Senator Matt Canavan became Minister for Northern Australia. Finance Minister Mathias Cormann retained Special Minister of State in which he had been acting for Mal Brough when Brough had earlier stood aside pending the outcome of Australian Federal Police investigations. Senator Scott Ryan became Minister for Vocational Education and Skills, while Alan Tudge became Minister for Human Services, Dan Tehan became Defence Materiel and Veterans Services Minister. Senator Concetta Fierravanti-Wells became Minister for International Development and the Pacific. Robb became Special Envoy for Trade until the next election.

The cabinet was increased to 22 ministers, while the outer ministry was reduced to 8. There are six women in the cabinet and another one in the outer ministry and three assistant ministers.

Cabinet

Outer Ministry

Assistant Ministers (Parliamentary Secretaries)

Whips
Prime Minister Turnbull announced the promotion of Nola Marino to Chief Government Whip and the promotions of Brett Whiteley and Ewen Jones to Government Whips on 27 September 2015. The Senate whip positions remained unchanged at that time.

House of Representatives

Senate

See also

Turnbull government
Second Turnbull ministry

Notes 
a  Ken Wyatt did not take his place in the executive until 30 September due to his absence from the country during the initial swearing-in.
b  Minister Jamie Briggs resigned on 29 December 2015 and Mal Brough temporarily stood aside from the ministry on the same day. Subsequently, Senator Mathias Cormann and Senator Marise Payne served as Acting Special Minister of State and Acting Minister for Defence Materiel and Science respectively. Brough later resigned from the ministry on 13 February 2016.

References

Ministries of Elizabeth II
Turnbull Government
Turnbull 1
2015 establishments in Australia
2016 disestablishments in Australia
Liberal Party of Australia
National Party of Australia
History of Australia (1945–present)
Cabinets established in 2015
Cabinets disestablished in 2016